Merryville High School is a K-12 school located in the town of Merryville, Louisiana. It is part of the Beauregard Parish School Board district and is one of 14 schools in Beauregard Parish.  

Donnie Love is the principal and  Scott Carnes vice principal. The mission statement for Merryville High School is "Creating a learning community to empower tomorrow`s leaders. Coming together, learning together, empowers success together."

Students
The graduation rate for Merryville High School is 97%, compared to the Beauregard Parish overall graduation rate of 93.9%. Of the 478 students, 48 percent are female and 52 percent are male. 16% of the students are minorities (primarily African American), below the state average of 54%. There are 41 full time teachers currently instructing. The student to teacher ratio is 12:1 which has not changed for five years.The Louisiana average student to teacher ratio is 16:1.

Extracurricular activities
Extracurricular activities include band, color guard, dance, cheer, and student council.

Athletics
Merryville High athletics competes in the LHSAA. The team mascot is a black Panther.

Sports sponsored include football, softball, baseball, and basketball.

Football
The football field at Merryville High School is named Keener-Cagle Stadium in honor of Christian Keener, a former Methodist church bishop and Chris Cagle.

Notable people
 Chris Cagle was an All-American football player at the United States Military Academy and spent time in the NFL as a player and coach in the 1930s and was inducted into the College Football Hall of Fame in 1954.

References

External links
 Merryville High School at the school district domain
 Merryville High School at Sharpschool

Education in Beauregard Parish, Louisiana
Public K-12 schools in Louisiana